Apache Rampart is an implementation of the WS-Security standard for the Axis2 Web services engine by the Apache Software Foundation. It supplies security features to web services by implementing the following specifications: 

 WS-Security
 WS-SecurityPolicy
 WS-Trust
 WS-SecureConversation
 SAML 1.1
 SAML 2.0

See also 
 Free Software Foundation
 Open Software Foundation

External links
 Apache Rampart at the Apache Software Foundation
 Apache Rampart C-language implementation at the Apache Software Foundation
 Apache AXIS2 at the Apache Software Foundation
 Web Services Security Policy Language V1.1 specification
 Security in a Web Services World: A Proposed Architecture and Roadmap
 WS-SecurityPolicy 1.2 OASIS Standard

Computer security software
Rampart module
Web services